Fletcher Abram, Jr. (born December 12, 1950) is an American former handball player who competed in the 1972 Summer Olympics.

He was born in Cary, Mississippi, but lived in Chicago, Illinois during his sporting career.

In 1972 he was part of the American team which finished 14th in the Olympic tournament. He played three matches and scored two goals.

Abram also served in the U.S. Army in 1972.

References

External links
 

1950 births
Living people
American male handball players
Olympic handball players of the United States
Handball players at the 1972 Summer Olympics
People from Sharkey County, Mississippi
Sportspeople from Mississippi
20th-century American people